Lena Christensenn is a Thai-Danish actress, television presenter and singer. She co-starred in the 2004 Thai film, SARS Wars and Oxide Pang's The Tesseract. She also forayed into Indian films by starring opposite Shreyas Talpade in Bombay to Bangkok, a Hindi film released in Jan'08.

In Thailand, she hosts an aerobics exercise television show and appears on a travel program. She has released an album, Lena Body Beats, on GMM Grammy.

For Bombay to Bangkok, Christensen was chosen from around 200 Thai actresses who auditioned for the role.

Filmography

References

External links

Year of birth missing (living people)
Living people
Lena Christensen
Lena Christensen
Lena Christensen
Lena Christensen
Lena Christensen
Lena Christensen
Lena Christensen
Place of birth missing (living people)